Tröegs is an American brewery located on Hersheypark Drive in Hershey, Pennsylvania.  John and Chris Trogner founded the company in 1996.  Tröegs is a craft-brewery, or microbrewery focusing their production on specialty and seasonal beers.  Tröegs also is a limited distribution brewery, only distributing beer to states within proximity to maintain beer freshness.

History
Tröegs was founded in 1996 in Harrisburg, Pennsylvania, by brothers John and Chris Trogner. The name Tröegs is a combination of a nickname derived from the surname Trogner and the Dutch word kroeg ("pub"). The 'o' carries a gratuitous umlaut as an exercise in foreign branding. The brewery was originally located at 800 Paxton Street in Harrisburg. Their first keg was sold to a Harrisburg restaurant in July, 1997.

Tröegs began construction of their new brewery in 2010 and moved from Harrisburg to Hershey in Fall 2011. Grand opening celebrations were held during November of that year. At approximately  the new brewery is about three times the size of the original facility and includes a tap house (tasting room) with a full view of the brewhouse. The tap house bar serves most beer by the glass, although a select few, including "corked-and-caged" beers, are sold by the bottle. Most of Tröegs' beers are available "to go"—as 4-packs, 6-packs, cases, growlers, and, most recently, as "crowlers" ( aluminum cans filled from a tap and then sealed; a portmanteau of "can" and "growler"). However, a few bottled beers have been available for consumption only in the tap room. The tap room also features an upscale "snack bar."

Every year, Tröegs is one of the sponsors of Harrisburg Beer Week with proceeds benefiting the Harrisburg River Rescue & Emergency Services. Held every year, it's a 10-day, multi-venue series showcasing breweries, restaurants, pubs and more through craft beer-centric events, demonstrations, and education throughout the greater Harrisburg area.

Self-guided tours are available daily during regular business hours. Guided tasting tours are also available by appointment.

Beers

Tröegs currently has sixteen beers in regular production. These are split between year-round and seasonal offerings. Seasonal beers are further split between "once a year" and "hop cycle," the latter being an annual rotation of hoppy beers.

"Scratch" beers

Tröegs also produces "Scratch" beers, an experimental series focusing on new techniques and non-traditional ingredients. These are available on a limited basis (often for only a few days or weeks) and have included weizenbocks, lagers, and barleywines, as well as barrel-aged beers. As of November 2020, over 425 beers have been offered as part of the Scratch Beer series. Several later entered regular production.

Canned beers

In late 2013 Tröegs began limited production of canned beers. Previously, Tröegs had only distributed its beer in kegs and glass bottles. As of December 2013, Perpetual IPA and Troegenator Double Bock have been made available in cans (12-ounce and 16-ounce cans, respectively).

Cork and caged beers

In fall 2013 Tröegs introduced its first cork and caged beers. As of August 2016 at least four cork and caged beers have been produced: LaGrave, a Triple Golden Ale; Master of Pumpkins, made with saison yeast and roasted pumpkin; Jovial, a Belgian Dubbel Ale; and Wild Elf, a barrel-aged version of the seasonal Mad Elf.  LaGrave and Jovial are part of a year-round production, while Master of Pumpkins is seasonal. Wild Elf, introduced in the summer of 2016, is also the first offering from the Splinter Cellar project

"Splinter" beers

The "Splinter" series of beers are barrel-aged and (prior to completion of the Splinter Cellar) were produced on a very limited basis.

In mid-2016 Tröegs completed its Splinter Cellar expansion, an addition on the northeast side of the facility. This contains three 20-foot tall wooden fermenters ("foeders") imported from Italy. The addition features a glass exterior, allowing a full view of the foeders from the outside. These have dramatically increased the brewery's capacity to produce wood aged beers. The addition also includes an art gallery and a new entrance for guided tours.  As of August 2016, expansion of the outdoor "beer garden" is underway, and parking lot improvements are under consideration.  Working on this project are Dave Maule Architects and Pyramid Construction, who were both involved in the Hershey build four years ago.

New artwork 
In late 2015, Tröegs revealed new artwork which would be featured on their beers and packaging.  Chris and John Trogner collaborated with Philadelphia-based designer Lindsey Tweed to come up with the fresh new look.  Along with the new artwork came a redesigned website and brand new merchandise.

Awards

Tröegs distribution states 
Pennsylvania
Ohio
Maryland
Delaware
New Jersey
Virginia
New York
Massachusetts
District of Columbia
Connecticut

See also 
 List of food companies

References

External links
History of Central PA Beer
Tröegs Brewing Company
RateBeer Ratings
BeerAdvocate Ratings
Cystic Fibrosis Foundation
Beer ad

Companies based in Harrisburg, Pennsylvania
Beer brewing companies based in Pennsylvania